Marcolini is an Italian surname. Notable people with the surname include:

Count Camillo Marcolini (1739-1814), minister of the fine arts, in the Electorate of Saxony
Eufrosina Marcolini Popescu (1821-1900), belongs to the 1st generation of Romanian stage actor
Giovanni Marcolini O.F.M. (died 1465), Bishop of Nocera de' Pagani
Leandro Marcolini Pedroso de Almeida, Hungarian footballer
Lucas Marcolini Dantas Bertucci (born 1989), Brazilian midfielder player 
Marcantonio Marcolini (1721-1782), Italian Roman Catholic bishop and cardinal 
Marietta Marcolini (1780-1855), Italian operatic contralto
Michele Marcolini, Italian footballer
Pierre Marcolini (born 1964), Belgian chocolatier

See also
Marcoli

Italian-language surnames